The "10th" annual (void) Venice International Film Festival was held from 30 August to 5 September 1942. The events were hosted at places far away from the Lido and very few countries participated due to World War II  and directors that were members of the Rome-Berlin axis. Additionally, a strong fascist political meddling from the Italian fascist government under Benito Mussolini had led to Italy experiencing a period of cultural depression oppressed by fascist propaganda.
It is the last edition before the suspension for the Second World War.

Jury
 Giuseppe Volpi di Misurata (Head of Jury)
 Joaquin Argamasilla  
 Ottavio Croze 
 Stavtscho Danailov  
 Augusto Fantechi 
 Wolfgang Fischer
 Mario Gromo 
 Aladar Haasz 
 Ferdinand Imhof 
 Manuel Lopez Ribeiro 
 Marijan Micac
 Karl Melzer
 Antonio Maraini 
 Mihai Puscariu 
 Yrio Erik Ranniko 
 Stefan Ravasz
 Carl Vincent

In Competition

Awards
Mussolini Cup
 Best Foreign Film -   (Veit Harlan)
 Best Italian Film -   (Augusto Genina) 
Volpi Cup
Best Actor - Fosco Giachetti 
Best Actress - Kristina Söderbaum
International Film Chamber Award
Technical -  (Francesco De Robertis)
Color -  (Veit Harlan)
Current Affairs

Animation Design
 (Roberto Sgrilli)
 (Antonio Rubino)
Biennale Award
 (José Leitão de Barros)
 (Paul Verhoeven)
Vienna Blood (Willi Forst)
 (Goffredo Alessandrini)
Odessa in Flames (Carmine Gallone)
 (Benito Perojo)
People of the Mountains (István Szőts)
Biennale Medal
The Cursed Village (Florián Rey)
 (Åke Ohberg)
 (Wilho Ilmari)
 (Zoltán Farkas)
Biennale Medal for documentary
 (Kurt Früh)
 (Fernando Cerchio)
 (Edmondo Cancellieri)
 (Walter Hege and V. Loewenstein)
 (Victor Borel)
 (Arturo Gemmiti)
 (István Horty)
 (Béla Molnar)

References

External links

Venice Film Festival 1942 Awards on IMDb

1942 film festivals
1942 in Italy
Venice Film Festival
 
August 1942 events
September 1942 events